"Weak" is a song by English singer Melanie C from her fifth studio album The Sea. It was released as the third single from the album on 6 November 2011. The song was written by Melanie C, Ina Wroldsen and Jez Ashurt and produced by Andy Chatterley.

Background and composition
"Weak" was a contrast from the previous dance-pop single "Think About It". "Weak" was described a stirring pop ballad that emotionally covered the range of emotions faced when you break up with a loved one. Reviews of the single were positive, "Entertainment Focus" stated "Weak is one of the highlights from The Sea and finds Melanie on fine vocal form. A slow-building beat backs Melanie’s distinctive vocals as she sings about being too weak to leave a relationship that is no good for her. The bridge is very powerful with Melanie’s vocals sending shivers down your spine as she lets rip". The single was placed on the BBC Radio 2 "A-list Radio Playlist". Melanie C performed the song on The Sea – Live tour.

Music video

Directed by Michael Baldwin, the music video premiered a week before the single dropped, the video showed Melanie in a London hotel room. The video shows the premise of her former lover dancing with another woman, whilst she is still in pain and suffering. The video has attracted over 500,000 views on YouTube.

B-side
The b-side "Stronger" was released as part of the digital bundle and limited edition CD release of "Weak" and "Let There Be Love". Melanie co-wrote 'Stronger' with Shelly Poole and Norwegian song writing and production duo Jim & Jack.

Chart performance
The single "Weak" entered the UK Indie Singles Chart at number 29. The single was within the top 60 most played songs in UK on radio though it failed to reach the top 200 of the UK Singles Chart. The "Weak" EP also reached number 1 in the Greek iTunes Chart.

Formats and track listings
These are the formats and track listings of major single releases of "Weak".

 Digital download
 "Weak"
 "Stronger"
 "Weak" 
 "Weak" 

 Limited edition CD
 "Weak"
 "Stronger"

References

2011 singles
Melanie C songs
Pop ballads
Songs written by Melanie C
Songs written by Ina Wroldsen
Songs written by Jez Ashurst
2010 songs